Alabama Hills is an unincorporated community in the Alabama Hills, in Inyo County, California. It lies at an elevation of 4534 feet (1382 m). The community was named after the CSS Alabama.

References

Unincorporated communities in California
Populated places in the Mojave Desert
Unincorporated communities in Inyo County, California